Lochmaeocles tessellatus is a species of beetle in the family Cerambycidae. It was described by James Thomson in 1868.

Subspecies
 Lochmaeocles tessellatus costaricae Chemsak, 1986
 Lochmaeocles tessellatus tessellatus (Thomson, 1868)

References

tessellatus
Beetles described in 1868